Maylene & The Sons of Disaster is the debut studio album by Maylene and the Sons of Disaster. The album was released on October 25, 2005 through Mono vs Stereo.

Background
Vocalist Dallas Taylor was originally the vocalist for Underoath, releasing three albums with the band. Prior to recording the band's fourth album, They're Only Chasing Safety, Taylor left the band for various reasons. In early 2004 Taylor sang for the musical group The New Tragic, featuring Phillip Reardon of From First to Last. Taylor formed Maylene and the Sons of Disaster in late–2004 with Scott Collum, Josh Cornutt, Roman Haviland, and Lee Turner. The band signed with Mono vs Stereo and began recording their debut album. Cornutt left the band after production ended, before the album's release, being replaced by Josh Williams.

Track listing

Personnel
Maylene and the Sons of Disaster
 Dallas Taylor – lead vocals
 Scott Collum – lead guitar
 Josh Cornutt – rhythm guitar, bass
 Roman Haviland – bass, backing vocals
 Lee Turner – drums, percussion

Additional personnel
 Bradley Lehman - Bass 
 Brad Blackwell – fiddle
 Jacob Bunton – acoustic guitar, mandolin, additional vocals
 Chris Mosley – additional vocals
 Rodney Reaves – additional vocals
 Michael Swann – resonator guitar, slide guitar
 Eric Chapman – engineer
 Jason Elgin – engineer, mixing, producer
 Roger Lian – mastering
 Brad Moist – A&R
 Matthew Lorne Clark - Guitar, additional vocals

References

2005 debut albums
Maylene and the Sons of Disaster albums
Mono vs Stereo albums